Pike Township is one of twelve townships in Jay County, Indiana, United States. As of the 2010 census, its population was 899 and it contained 355 housing units.

History
Pike Township was organized in 1837.

The James Haines Farm was listed on the National Register of Historic Places in 2000.

Geography
The streams of Buckeye Creek, Buckeye Creek, Old Run, Rest Run and Sale Run run through this township. The Goshen Creek also runs through this township.

Unincorporated towns
 Antioch
 Bluff Point
 Boundary City
 Collett

Adjacent townships
 Wayne Township (north)
 Noble Township (northeast)
 Madison Township (east)
 Jackson Township, Randolph County (southeast)
 Ward Township, Randolph County (south)
 Franklin Township, Randolph County (southwest)
 Jefferson Township (west)
 Greene Township (northwest)

Cemeteries
The township contains seven cemeteries, 3 of which still operate- in operation- Antioch Cemetery, Boundary Cemetery and Zoar Cemetery. Non operated cemeteries are Clark Family Burial Ground, Hawkins Cemetery, Kunce Cemetery, and an unnamed cemetery on land owned by Margaret R. Warren c/o Robin Khayyata, according to the public record.

Major highways

References
 U.S. Board on Geographic Names (GNIS)
 United States Census Bureau cartographic boundary files

External links
 Indiana Township Association
 United Township Association of Indiana

Townships in Jay County, Indiana
Townships in Indiana